Bremia may refer to:
 Bremia (fly), a genus of flies in the family Cecidomyiidae
 Bremia (protist), a genus of protists in the family Peronosporaceae
 Bremia (fort), fort in Wales